Choi Bo-Kyung  (born 12 April 1988) is a South Korean footballer who plays as a defender for Jeonbuk Hyundai Motors in the K League 1.

Honours
Ulsan Hyundai
 AFC Champions League (1): 2012

Jeonbuk Hyundai Motors
 K League 1 (1): 2014

External links 

1988 births
Living people
Association football defenders
South Korean footballers
Ulsan Hyundai FC players
Jeonbuk Hyundai Motors players
Ansan Mugunghwa FC players
K League 1 players
K League 2 players
People from Gwangyang
Sportspeople from South Jeolla Province